The falconet was a light cannon developed in the late 15th century that fired a smaller shot than the similar falcon. During the Middle Ages guns were decorated with engravings of animals, such as reptiles, birds or mythical beasts depending on their size. For example, a culverin would often feature snakes, as the handles on the early cannons were often decorated to resemble serpents. The falconet fired small yet lethal shot of similar weight and size to a bird of prey, and so was decorated with a falcon. They could also be used to fire grapeshot.

The falconet resembled an oversized matchlock musket with two wheels attached to improve mobility. In 1620s Germany a breechloading version was invented, seeing action in the Thirty Years War. Many falconets were in use during the English Civil War as they were lighter and cheaper than the culverins, sakers and minions. During times of unrest they were used by the nobility to defend their grand houses.

Though developed for use on land, the falconet gained naval prominence during the 17th century for the defense of light vessels; for example, on small boats for boarding maneuvers.

Gallery

See also 

 Lela, Southeast Asian equivalent of falconet
 Culverin
 History of gunpowder

References

External links
Artillery through the ages
Picture of a 17th century falconet

Cannon
Naval artillery